Gymnothorax dorsalis is a moray eel found in the western Pacific Ocean, around Hong Kong, Malacca, Malaysia, and Taiwan. It was first named by Seale in 1917.

References

dorsalis
Fish described in 1917
Taxa named by Alvin Seale